William Robbins may refer to:

William Robbins (athlete) (1885–1962), American athlete competing at the 1908 Summer Olympics
William D. Robbins (1874–1952), mayor of Toronto in the 1930s
William H. Robbins (1926–2009), American NASA engineer
William Jacob Robbins (1890–1978), American botanist
William M. Robbins (1828–1905), U.S. Representative from North Carolina
William Robbins (actor) (died 1645), English comic actor in the Jacobean and Caroline eras

See also
William Robins (disambiguation)